The Dancing Couple is a 1663 oil-on-canvas painting by Jan Steen. It depicts a boisterous party with a dancing couple in the center. The work is in the Widener Collection of the National Gallery of Art in Washington, D.C. In the painting Jan Steen creates a very festive environment. The setting of the painting is at a kermis, which is a local village fair that holds many symbolic references in Dutch art and was very popular in the Bruegel tradition.

References 

1663 paintings
Collections of the National Gallery of Art
Paintings by Jan Steen
Dance in art